The Albers equal-area conic projection, or Albers projection (named after Heinrich C. Albers), is a conic, equal area map projection that uses two standard parallels.  Although scale and shape are not preserved, distortion is minimal between the standard parallels.

The Albers projection is used by the United States Geological Survey and the United States Census Bureau. Most of the maps in the National Atlas of the United States use the Albers projection. It is also one of the standard projections used by the government of British Columbia, and the sole governmental projection for the Yukon.

Formulas

For Sphere
Snyder  describes generating formulae for the projection, as well as the projection's characteristics.

where

Lambert equal-area conic 
If just one of the two standard parallels of the Albers projection is placed on a pole, the result is the Lambert equal-area conic projection.

See also

 List of map projections

References

External links

Mathworld's page on the Albers projection
Table of examples and properties of all common projections, from radicalcartography.net
An interactive Java Applet to study the metric deformations of the Albers Projection.

Map projections
Equal-area projections